Tuttulikassak (old spelling: Tugtulikavsak) is a nunatak in Avannaata municipality in northwestern Greenland.

Geography 
Tuttulikassak is one of several nunataks in the Melville Bay region of Greenland, where the Greenland ice sheet drains into the bay alongside its entire length apart from an occasional nunatak. Tuttulikassak is located on the mainland of Greenland in the northernmost part of Upernavik Archipelago, delimiting its northern end. To the east, Greenland icesheet drains southwards into Melville Bay via Hayes Glacier.

Administrative border 
After that date both municipalities and the entire coast of Melville Bay were part of Qaasuitsup municipality.

Since 1 January 2018 it has been part of Avannaata municipality.

References 

Melville Bay
Nunataks of Greenland
Upernavik Archipelago